The Order of Olga (Württemberg) (German: Olga-Orden) was created by Karl I, King of Württemberg, on 27 June 1871, to honor his queen consort, Grand Duchess Olga Nikolaevna of Russia. Its primary purpose was to honor women who cared for wounded soldiers in the Franco-Prussian War of 1870 – 1871. While it was conferred on a few men, it remained largely a women's order.

The insignia was a cross of silver with the interlocking cipher of the King Karl and Queen Olga on the obverse and the years 1870-71 on the reverse.  This emblem was suspended from a red and black ribbon. Men, including the king, wore it from the buttonhole of his coat or as a military medal, while ladies wore it suspended form a large bow on their left breast.

In 1889, a similar medal was created – the Karl Olga Medal – for service to the Red Cross. This decoration was, incidentally, also given primarily to women, but was not part of the Order of Olga.

Sources
 Tagore, Rajah Sir Sourindro Mohun. The Orders of Knighthood, British and Foreign. Calcutta, India: The Catholic Orphan Press, 1884
 Maximilian Gritzner, Handbuch der Ritter- und Verdienstorden aller Kulturstaaten der Welt innerhalb des XIX. Jahrhunderts. Auf Grund amtlicher und anderer zuverlässiger Quellen zusammengestellt,  Verlag: Leipzig: Verlagsbuchhandlung von J. J. Weber, 1893
 Jörg Nimmergut, Deutschland-Katalog, 2002

Olga, Order of
Olga, Order of
Orders, decorations, and medals of Württemberg
1871 establishments in Germany
1919 disestablishments in Germany
19th-century establishments in Württemberg
Awards established in 1871
Awards disestablished in 1919
Franco-Prussian War